Michael or Mickey Devine may refer to:

Michael Devine (hunger striker) (1954–1981), INLA hunger striker who died in 1981
Michael Devine (footballer) (born 1973), Irish footballer
Mickey Devine (1892–1937), baseball player from the early 20th century